Bright Eyes is a 1929 British-Austrian silent romance film directed by Géza von Bolváry and starring Betty Balfour, Jack Trevor, and Fritz Greiner. It is also known under the alternative title of Champagner.

The film was a co-production between British International Pictures and Sascha-Film. Bolváry directed the film after travelling to Britain to make The Wrecker and stayed on to make another film, The Vagabond Queen, before returning to Germany.

Plot summary

Cast

References

Bibliography

External links
 
 

1929 films
1929 romance films
Films directed by Géza von Bolváry
1920s German-language films
British black-and-white films
Films with screenplays by Franz Schulz
Austrian black-and-white films
Austrian romance films
British romance films
1920s British films